Daniel Ginsberg (born 4 February 1993) is an American-Israeli professional basketball player from New York.

Early life 

Daniel is a Patrick & Henry Community College graduate. He is a former Blue Ridge School basketball player and worked with NBA All-Star Stephon Marbury in Beijing, China.
 
He established a basketball instruction service upon his return to Charlottesville from playing abroad.
 
He holds certifications in both fitness coaching and plant-based nutrition.

Professional career 

Due to too major injuries, he returned to Charlottesville and founded a basketball training business Utrain.
 
In 2016-2017 Ginsberg averaged 10.1ppg, 5.3 asst, 3.1 reb and 2.5 steals for the New England Anchors (ABA). In 2017-2018 Ginsberg averaged 11.2ppg, 5.4apg, 4.1rpg for Hapoel Eilat (Israel).

References

External links 
 official website
 Twitter
 Instagram
 LinkedIn
 Facebook
 Daniel Ginsberg on YouTube

1993 births
Living people
American men's basketball players
Basketball players from New York City
American expatriate basketball people in Israel
Hapoel Eilat basketball players
American strength and conditioning coaches
Sportspeople from Charlottesville, Virginia
Basketball players from Virginia